Nima Arkani-Hamed (born April 5, 1972) is an American-Canadian  theoretical physicist of Iranian descent, with interests in high-energy physics, quantum field theory, string theory, cosmology and collider physics. Arkani-Hamed is a member of the permanent faculty at the Institute for Advanced Study in Princeton, New Jersey. He is also Director of the Carl P. Feinberg Cross-Disciplinary Program in Innovation at the Institute and director of The Center for Future High Energy Physics (CFHEP) in Beijing, China.

Early life
Arkani-Hamed's parents, Jafargholi "Jafar" Arkani-Hamed and Hamideh Alasti are both physicists from Iran. His father, a native of Tabriz, had worked for the Apollo program in the early 1970s, was chairman of the physics department at Sharif University of Technology in Tehran, and later taught earth and planetary sciences at McGill University in Montreal. Arkani-Hamed was born in Houston and spent the early years of his life between Iran and the United States. He would accompany his father on hikes in Tehran almost every weekend.

Following the 1979 Islamic Revolution, Arkani-Hamed's family decided to return to Iran, as the new Iranian government promised free expression and possibilities. The Cultural Revolution, however, which followed shortly after the 1979 Revolution, resulted in Iran's universities being forcefully shut down. Arkani-Hamed's father, Jafar, who at the time worked at Sharif University in Tehran, wrote a petition with his colleagues denouncing the closures. Arkani-Hamed's father and his colleagues were subsequently blacklisted by the new government; those who were caught were either imprisoned or hanged according to Arkani-Hamed's father. His father, who subsequently had to go underground, spent his entire life savings to get himself and his family out of the country. Arkani-Hamed, who was 10-years old at the time, fled with his family to Canada.

Academic career
Arkani-Hamed graduated from the University of Toronto with a joint honours degree in mathematics and physics in 1993, and went to the University of California, Berkeley, for his graduate studies, where he worked under the supervision of  Lawrence Hall. The majority of his graduate work was on studies of supersymmetry and flavor physics. His Ph.D. dissertation was titled "Supersymmetry and Hierarchies". He completed his Ph.D. in 1997 and completed his post-doctoral studies in the SLAC Theory Group at Stanford University. During this time he worked with Savas Dimopoulos and Gia Dvali to develop the paradigm of large extra dimensions.

In 1999 he joined the faculty of the University of California, Berkeley physics department. He took a leave of absence from Berkeley to visit Harvard University beginning January 2001, and stayed at Harvard as a professor from 2002 to 2008. Since 2008, he has been a professor in the School of Natural Sciences at the Institute for Advanced Study in Princeton, New Jersey.

Since 2013, Arkani-Hamed has been a leader in research on the amplituhedron as a geometric structure that simplifies calculations of particle interactions in certain quantum field theories.

In 2021 he became the first Carl P. Feinberg Director of the Cross-Disciplinary Program in Innovation at the Institute for Advanced Study.

Honors and awards

In 2003 he won the Gribov Medal of the European Physical Society, and in the summer of 2005 while at Harvard he won the Phi Beta Kappa award for teaching excellence. In 2008, he won the Raymond and Beverly Sackler Prize given at Tel Aviv University to young scientists who have made outstanding and fundamental contributions in Physical Science. He was elected to the American Academy of Arts and Sciences in 2009.
A. D. White Professor-at-Large at Cornell University from 2013 to 2019. In 2012 he was an inaugural awardee of the Fundamental Physics Prize, the creation of physicist and internet entrepreneur, Yuri Milner. He was one of six physicists featured in the award-winning 2013 documentary film 
Particle Fever, and was elected to the National Academy of Sciences in 2017. In 2021, he was awarded the Sakurai Prize of the American Physical Society.

See also
 Amplituhedron
 List of theoretical physicists

References

External links

 Elizabeth Landau, "Colliding with nature's best-kept secrets", CNN, 9 May 2008 (accessed 10 May 008).
 Arkani-Hamed's papers in SPIRES database
 Arkani-Hamed's papers in the INSPIRE Database
 Stock Exchange Of Visions: Visions of Nima Arkani-Hamed (Video Interviews)
"The Power of Principles: Physics Revealed - A conversation with Nima Arkani-Hamed" , Ideas Roadshow, 2013
Faculty page for Nima Arkani-Hamed, Professor in the School of Natural Sciences at the Institute for Advanced Study

Lectures
 "The Future of Fundamental Physics" five lectures given at Cornell October 4–8, 2010 in the Messenger Lecture series. 
 "Introduction to Scattering Amplitudes" five lectures given at Cornell October 4–8, 2010, focus on n=4 supersymmetric Yang–Mills Theory.
 "The End of Spacetime , a lecture given at SLAC National Accelerator Laboratory on June 19, 2018.

1972 births
Living people
American people of Iranian descent
Canadian people of Iranian descent
American emigrants to Canada
Naturalized citizens of Canada
21st-century American physicists
Canadian physicists
American string theorists
Harvard University faculty
Stanford University postdoctoral scholars
University of California, Berkeley College of Letters and Science faculty
Institute for Advanced Study faculty
University of Toronto alumni
UC Berkeley College of Letters and Science alumni
Fellows of the American Academy of Arts and Sciences
Iranian expatriate academics
Academics of Iranian descent
People from Houston